Wait for the Siren marks the eighth album from Project 86. The band released the project independently on August 21, 2012. Project 86 worked with Andrew Schwab and Steve Wilson on the production of this album.

Reception

Specifying in a four star review by HM Magazine, Dan MacIntosh responds, "Inspiration is an intangible: either a band sounds inspired or it doesn't and Project 86 most certainly comes off born anew with Wait for the Siren... Don't wait for any siren; make Project 86's new album the very next sound you hear." Michael Weaver, indicating in a five star review from Jesus Freak Hideout, recognizes, "From the musical to the lyrical, this is the most well-rounded Project 86 album to date." New Release Tuesday's Mary Nikkel delivering a five star review, replying, "This release promises to stand the test of time as a monument in the hardcore field." Specifying in a five star review by Indie Vision Music, Lee Brown reports, "Wait for the Siren continues to bring a new and diverse sound while still being distinctly Project 86."

Track listing

Personnel
Andrew Schwab – vocals
 Dustin Lowery – guitar, backing vocals
 Scott Davis – layout design, percussion

Additional musicians
 Bruce Fitzhugh (Living Sacrifice) – guest vocals on track 2
 Brian "Head" Welch (Love & Death, Korn) – guest vocals on track 7
 Andrew Welch (Disciple) – guitar
 Blake Martin (A Plea for Purging) – guitar
 Cody Driggers (The Wedding) – bass
 Rocky Gray (Soul Embraced, Living Sacrifice) – drums
 The Wedding – gang vocals
 Caleb Cox – uillean pipes
 Tim Garrison – mandolin
 Garrett Viggers – hammer dulcimer

Production
 Steve Blackmon – Digital Editing, Engineer, Mixing
 Jordan Butcher – Layout Design
 Jeremiah Scott – Digital Editing
 Steve Wilson – Digital Editing, Engineer, Mastering, Producer, Vocals (Background)

Charts

References

2012 albums
Project 86 albums